The 1994 Bank of the West Classic was a women's tennis tournament played on indoor carpet courts at the Oakland-Alameda County Coliseum Arena in Oakland, California in the United States and was part of the Tier II category of the 1994 WTA Tour. It was the 23rd edition of the tournament ran from October 31 through November 6, 1994. First-seeded Arantxa Sánchez Vicario won the singles title and earned $80,000 first-prize money as well as 300 ranking points.

Finals

Singles

 Arantxa Sánchez Vicario defeated  Martina Navratilova 1–6, 7–6(7–5), 7–6(7–3)
 It was Sánchez Vicario's 8th singles title of the year and the 20th of her career.

Doubles

 Lindsay Davenport /  Arantxa Sánchez Vicario defeated  Gigi Fernández /  Martina Navratilova 7–5, 6–4

References

External links
 Official website
 ITF tournament edition details
 Tournament draws

Bank of the West Classic
Silicon Valley Classic
Bank of the West Classic
Bank of the West Classic
Bank of the West Classic
Bank of the West Classic